Dying & Falling is the third album of the Illinois-based industrial band, I:Scintilla. Like their previous album Optics, there were two version released. One was a single disc version and the other was a limited edition version with a bonus disc, titled Resuscitation, containing additional studio recordings as well as remixes.

The artwork was illustrated by singer Brittany Bindrim.

Track listing
 "Swimmers Can Drown" - 04:07
 "Sharia Under a Beauty Curse" - 03:46
 "Ammunition" - 04:54
 "Worth the Wait" - 04:34
 "Mothership" - 03:53
 "Dying & Falling" - 04:54
 "Face the Kill" - 04:31
 "The Shake" - 04:09
 "Prey On You" - 06:32
 "Shattered" - 05:41
 "Omen" - 04:11

Resuscitation Track Listings
 "Hollowed" - 03:29
 "I Want It All" - 05:15
 "The Shake [Volatile Night Version]" - 04:16
 "Swimmers Can Drown [Iris Mix]" - 04:58
 "I Want It All [Essence Of Mind Mix]" - 06:09
 "Worth the Wait [Neurobash Mix]" - 03:35
 "Hollowed [The Dreamside Mix]" - 05:23
 "Swimmers Can Drown [Voicans Mix]" - 04:24 
 "Prey On You [DJ Ram Mix]" - 05:53
 "Swimmers Can Drown [Freakangel Mix]" - 03:55
 "Ammunition [Essence Of Mind Mix]" - 04:20

References 

I:Scintilla albums
2010 albums